Robbie or Robby Robinson may refer to:

Robbie Dale, DJ on Radio Caroline and Radio Veronica during the 1960s and 1970s
Robbie Robinson (footballer) (1879–c. 1951), English footballer of the early 1900s
Robbie Robinson (soccer) (born 1998), American soccer player
Robby Robinson (musician), keyboardist and musical director for The Four Seasons
Robbie Robinson (referee) (born 1959), American basketball referee
Robbie Robinson (rugby union) (born 1989), New Zealand rugby union player
Robby Robinson (bodybuilder) (born 1946), American former bodybuilder
Wilbert Robinson (1863–1934), nicknamed Uncle Robbie, American baseball player
Henry W. Robinson (1893–?), American football player for the Auburn Tigers.
W. M. Robinson (1902–1982), American football player for the Florida Gators.

See also
Robert Robinson (disambiguation)
Bobby Robinson (disambiguation)